The 2021–22 Wisconsin Badgers women's basketball team represented the University of Wisconsin at Madison during the 2021–22 NCAA Division I women's basketball season. The Badgers are led by first-year head coach Marisa Moseley and play their home games at the Kohl Center as members of the Big Ten Conference. They will compete in the 2021–22 Big Ten Conference season and the 2022 Big Ten women's basketball tournament.

Previous season 
The Badgers finished the 2020–21 season 5–19, including 2–18 in Big Ten play, to finish in last place. They lost in the first round of the Big Ten women's tournament to Illinois. After the loss, they fired Jonathan Tsipis. On March 26, 2021, Marisa Moseley was named the 8th coach in the history of the Badgers.

After the season, the team lost one player to graduation and two players to transfers, while adding one player as a transfer.

Roster

Recruiting Class

Schedule and results

|-
!colspan=12 style=| Exhibition

|-
!colspan=9 style= | Non-conference regular season

|-  
!colspan=12 style=|Big Ten tournament

Source

See also
2021–22 Wisconsin Badgers men's basketball team

References

Wisconsin Badgers women's basketball seasons
Wisconsin
Wisconsin Badgers women's basketball
Wisconsin Badgers women's basketball